Missak Kouyumjian (September 8, 1877 Caesarea, Ankara Vilayet, Ottoman Empire - September 13, 1913 Adana, Ottoman Turkey), better known by his pen name Arandzar, was an Armenian short story writer, poet, and principal.

References

External links
 Arandzar - A First in World Literature? by Eddie Arnavoudian

1877 births
1913 deaths
People from Kayseri
People from Angora vilayet
Armenians from the Ottoman Empire
20th-century writers from the Ottoman Empire
20th-century Armenian writers